Warner Bros. Studio Tours are a pair of public attractions owned and run by Warner Bros. Entertainment Inc.

Studio Tours
The studio tours are both built into existing film studios, offering an authentic glimpse into the techniques and craft of filmmaking.

Warner Bros. Studio Tour Hollywood

Warner Bros. Studio Tour Hollywood is a public attraction situated inside Warner Bros. Studios, Burbank in Burbank, California that offers visitors the chance to glimpse behind the scenes of one of the oldest and most popular film studios in the world.

The tour in some form has been open for several decades, but was recently renamed to give the Warner Bros. Studio Tours a more uniform identity after the success of Warner Bros. Studio Tour London in Leavesden. Previously it was known as the Warner Bros. Studios VIP Tour.

Tours depart every 10 minutes and last about 1 hour with a guide who leads a small group on a custom tram.  The tour stops at various locations on the backlot and front lot.  The tour starts on the backlot where you see old sets on Hennessy Street where they filmed scenes from Annie, Minority Report and Gremlins.  There is a stop in the Jungle where you get to see Merlottes from True Blood and the lagoon where one of the final scenes from ER was filmed.  On Midwest Street the tram stops and there is plenty to see including the sets from Gilmore Girls (Stars Hollow), Pretty Little Liars (Rosewood), Miss Deagle's House from Gremlins which is also the Seaver house from Growing Pains.  The High School is dressed from the set of Grease Live and there are many more sets like Lukes Diner, The Brew, The Alibi Room (Shameless), The Church (Waltons & The Lost Boys), The Geller House (Friends) and The Fuller House house.  New York and Chicago Streets are the setting for ER and Shameless where Patsy's Pies is a practical set used from filming.  New York Street is the setting for iconic scenes from Auntie Mame, Whatever Happened to Baby Jane, House of Wax and Argo.

The Front Lot contains all of the sound stages.  The Tour stops in a few stages including Stage 25 where they tape The Big Bang Theory, Stage 1 where they tape the Ellen Show and there are many other stages where they film including Conan, The Fosters, Lucifer, and The Real.  The biggest stage on the Lot is Stage 16 where they filmed scenes from Dunkirk, The Perfect Storm and The Goonies.  Stage 16 is also where Emma Stone and Ryan Gosling can be seen walking in the film La La Land.  Also on the Front Lot is the Prop House with tons of artifacts and furniture from films and TV shows from the 1920s to today.  Next to the prop house is the Batcave, where 10 Batmobiles are on display from several of the Batman Films.  Jokers car from Suicide Squad is on display front and center.

At the end of the guided portion of the Tour, there is custom built soundstage called Stage 48.  Inside this facility there is the real Central Perk set from Friends.  Pictures can be taken on the orange sofa that the cast sat on during taping of the series.  There are green screen photo opportunities where you can ride a Batpod through Gotham City or a Nimbus 2000 broom through Hogwarts and even play a game of Quidditch.  There is event a working Central Perk Cafe that serves Central Perk branded coffee

The Warner Archive contains a displays of props and costumes in DC Universe:The Exhibit from Batman vs Superman:Dawn of Justice and Wonder Woman including Diana's training armour, Warrior Costume and even here Lasso and Sword.  The Sword is set in the golden requiem.  The upper levels have some of the original props and sets from the Harry Potter films including the costumes from Harry, Hermione and Ron.  Fantastic Beasts and Where to Find Them is represented as well with Newt Scamander's suit and Jacob's apartment complete with the case of creatures and baked goods.

Warner Bros. Studio Tour London – The Making of Harry Potter

Warner Bros. Studio Tour London – The Making of Harry Potter is a walkthrough exhibition and studio tour in Leavesden, South East England. It is located within Warner Bros. Studios, Leavesden, near Watford, in southwest Hertfordshire, and houses a permanent exhibit of authentic costumes, props and sets utilized in the production of the Harry Potter films, as well as behind-the-scenes production of visual effects. The tour is contained in Soundstages J and K, which were specially built for the attraction, and is separate from the studio's actual production facilities. It opened to the public in early 2012. The grand opening event was attended by many of the Harry Potter film series cast and crew members.

Each tour session typically lasts three and a half hours, and the tour has the capacity to handle 6,000 visitors daily. Despite Warner Bros. being the studio behind Harry Potter, the tour is not styled as a theme park due to the fact that Warner Bros. sold the license to do so to Universal Studios. Instead, visitors get a chance to see up close the detail and effort that goes into a major feature film at the scale of the Harry Potter series. TripAdvisor reported that Warner Bros. Studio Tour London – The Making of Harry Potter has been the highest-rated attraction worldwide every year since the tour opened.

Warner Bros. Studio Tour Tokyo – The Making of Harry Potter

Announced in August 2020, Warner Bros. Studio Tour Tokyo – The Making of Harry Potter is an upcoming attraction in Tokyo, Japan. This will be the second such park in the world, after the one in London, which opened in 2012. It will be located in the Tokyo Nerima Ward, on part of the now-defunct Toshimaen amusement park site. Similar to its counterpart in London, the 30,000 square-meter attraction in Tokyo will offer visitors a walking tour through some of the recreated famous film sets including the Great Hall, the Forbidden Forest, and the Diagon Alley. It will also display film sets, costumes, and props that were used in the Harry Potter films. In addition to Harry Potter, it will also cover the Fantastic Beasts spin-offs. The attraction is scheduled to be opened on June 16 of 2023. Steam locomotive 4920 Dumbleton Hall, that is identical to the locomotive used in the Harry Potter movies, will be an exhibit.

Other Warner Bros. Public Attractions
Warner Bros. has licensed several other attraction operators to use various copyrights belonging to WB.

The Wizarding World of Harry Potter

Rights to build a theme park based on the Harry Potter films were sold to Universal Parks & Resorts, this property has matured into an immersive themed land with rides and attractions named The Wizarding World of Harry Potter. The enormous undertaking has been immensely popular, following the first at Universal Orlando Resort's Universal's Islands of Adventure and Universal Studios Florida. The themed land has since been established at Universal Studios Hollywood, Japan,.

Warner Bros. Movie World

Warner Bros. Movie World is a theme park on the Gold Coast in Australia. Currently owned and operated by Village Roadshow Theme Parks, the theme park features a variety of attractions that are based on Warner Bros.'s franchises. Village Roadshow is a long time partner of Warner Bros. and the parks feature properties owned by both them and WB.

Warner Bros. World Abu Dhabi 

Warner Bros. World Abu Dhabi is a theme park in Abu Dhabi, United Arab Emirates. Developed by Miral Asset Management in 2018, under a licence from Warner Bros., the theme park features a variety of attractions that are based on Warner Bros.'s franchises. A 257-room Warner Bros. branded hotel named WB Abu Dhabi, is currently being constructed adjacent to the park and will be operated by Hilton Hotels & Resorts when it opens in 2021.

Parque Warner Madrid 

Parque Warner Madrid is a theme park in Madrid, Spain. Owned partially by Warner Bros., the theme park features a variety of attractions that are based on Warner Bros.'s franchises.

See also
 Warner Bros. Global Brands and Experiences
 Warner Bros. Studio Tour Hollywood
 Warner Bros. Studio Tour London - The Making of Harry Potter
 Warner Bros. Studios, Burbank
 Warner Bros. Studios, Leavesden
 The Wizarding World of Harry Potter (Warner Bros. Movie World)
 The Wizarding World of Harry Potter (Universal Studios)
 Warner Bros. Movie World
Warner Bros. World Abu Dhabi
Parque Warner Madrid
 Universal Parks & Resorts
 Village Roadshow Theme Parks
 Warner Bros.
 Halloween Horror Nights
 Incidents at Universal parks
 List of licensed properties at Universal Parks & Resorts
 Halloween Fright Nights

References

External links
 Warner Bros. Studio Tour Hollywood website
 Warner Bros. Studio Tour London website

 
Warner Bros.